James Peter McKenna (18 April 1910 – 1986) was an English professional footballer who played as a goalkeeper. He played once in the English Football League for Leicester City, in a 3–1 First Division victory over Birmingham City at Filbert Street on 26 March 1932. He signed for the "Foxes" from Great Harwood in February 1930, and left for Bath City in May 1932.

Career statistics
Source:

References

1910 births
1986 deaths
Sportspeople from Blackpool
English footballers
Association football goalkeepers
Port Vale F.C. players
Great Harwood F.C. players
Leicester City F.C. players
Bath City F.C. players
Nuneaton Borough F.C. players
Market Harborough Town F.C. players
English Football League players
Southern Football League players